The Invisible Life is a Portuguese feature-length drama film directed by Vítor Gonçalves and produced by the Portuguese production company Rosa Filmes.

The film's world premiere was at the international competition of the 2013 Rome Film Festival.

Plot
The film follows the interior life of Hugo, a middle-aged public servant who lives by night at his workplace, the palace of Terreiro do Paço in Lisbon from where centuries before the Portuguese Empire was governed, nowadays ministries of the Portuguese government. Obsessed with the 8mm footage he discovered at the belongings of António, his recently deceased superior, Hugo recalls the day António told him he was dying. These memories unexpectedly bring back others, including remembrances of the last time Hugo saw Adriana, the last woman he loved, who is nowadays living in another country.

Cast
 Filipe Duarte as Hugo
 Maria João Pinho as Adriana
 João Perry as António
 Pedro Lamares as Sandro
 Susana Arrais as the nurse

Production
The film marks Vítor Gonçalves return to feature filmmaking after a hiatus of more than twenty years following his acclaimed debut with the cult-film A Girl In Summer.

Reception
The Guardian'''s Andrew Pulver awarded the film four stars, describing it as "rigorous, elegant study of emotional crisis." Sukhdev Sandhu, writing in Sight & Sound'', said the film "asks raw, unsettling questions of us all."

References

External links
 

2013 films
2013 independent films
Portuguese drama films
2010s Portuguese-language films
Films set in Portugal
Films shot in Portugal
Portuguese independent films
British drama films
British independent films
2013 drama films
2010s British films